Ezequiel Alexander Denis (born 4 April 1996) is an Argentine professional footballer who plays as a forward for Real España.

Career
Denis had spells with Ferro de Alvear and Independiente (GP) in his youth career, prior to joining Independiente of Avellaneda in 2011 and making the step into senior football in 2017. He was promoted into the club's first-team squad towards the end of 2017, being an unused substitute for an Argentine Primera División match with Racing Club on 25 November. On 9 December, Denis came off the substitute's bench in a league match with Arsenal de Sarandí to make his professional debut and subsequently scored a stoppage time winner in a 1–2 victory. He was loaned to Almagro of Primera B Nacional in July 2018.

Denis remained with Almagro for two seasons, scoring goals against Central Córdoba, Temperley and Quilmes across thirty-two total appearances. Denis returned to Independiente in June 2020, before departing on loan to Paraguayan Primera División side General Díaz in the succeeding October. However, in early November, Denis terminated his deal after not featuring. On 3 February 2021, Denis terminated his contract in order to join Primera B Nacional's San Martín.

In January 2022, Denis moved to Honduran club Real C.D. España.

Career statistics
.

References

External links

1996 births
Living people
People from General Pico
Argentine footballers
Association football forwards
Argentine expatriate footballers
Club Atlético Independiente footballers
Club Almagro players
General Díaz footballers
San Martín de San Juan footballers
Real C.D. España players
Argentine Primera División players
Primera Nacional players
Liga Nacional de Fútbol Profesional de Honduras players
Expatriate footballers in Paraguay
Expatriate footballers in Honduras
Argentine expatriate sportspeople in Paraguay
Argentine expatriate sportspeople in Honduras